The Eikefet Tunnel is a road tunnel in Alver Municipality in Vestland county, Norway.  The  tunnel is part of the European route E39 highway through the mountain Kjellrusen from the village of Eikefet to Odnåstjørni.  The tunnel is the longest of a series of tunnels along this highway through Lindås.

The tunnel was opened on 27 March 1980. When it opened, it was Norway's longest road tunnel. Eikefet has rated poorly in safety testing by the European Tunnel Assessment Programme.

References

Alver (municipality)
Road tunnels in Vestland